The Rally Argentina is an Argentine rally competition that has been a round of the World Rally Championship, the Intercontinental Rally Challenge, the South American Rally Championship and the Argentine Rally Championship. It is held in the area around Villa Carlos Paz in Córdoba Province, on narrow gravel roads best known for their water-splashes.

History
The rally was first run in 1980, in Tucumán Province and organized by the Automovil Club Argentino. The winners of that first edition were Walter Röhrl and Christian Geistdörfer (Fiat 131 Abarth). In the 1981 season the rally took again place in Tucumán, but in 1982 was not held. In 1983 it was moved to San Carlos de Bariloche, but in 1984 was moved to Córdoba Province, where it has been held ever since.

In the 2006 season, the rally was held on April 28, 2006 through April 30, 2006 as the fifth rally on the World Rally Championship schedule for 2006. In order to attract more spectators, in 2007 one of the sections of the rally was run in Buenos Aires in the River Plate Football Stadium, and another section in the Chateau Carreras Stadium in Córdoba city.

In 2012, the route was expanded to include some 500 km (300 mi) of competitive stages, making it the longest rally in the modern era of the sport. Famous stages include El Condor- and Mina Clavero.

Winners since 1980 

Pink background indicates that in that year the rally was not part of WRC calendar.

Multiple winners

References

External links

 Official site
 Rally Argentina at eWRC-results

 
Argentina
Argentina
Recurring sporting events established in 1980
1980 establishments in Argentina
Argentina